The 9th Lux Style Awards ceremony was held in 2010 at the Expo Centre, Lahore, Pakistan. It honored the best film, television, music, and fashion achievements in the Pakistani entertainment industry. After the previous year's ceremony was cancelled in favour of a photo op with the award winners due to the prevailing security outlook in the country, the ceremony returned for the 9th edition of the awards.

Comedian Sami Shah hosted the ceremony.

Awards and nominations
Winners are listed first, in boldface.

Film

Television

Music

Fashion

Special

Chairperson's Lifetime Achievement Award
Roohi Bano

References

External links

Lux Style Awards
Lux Style Awards
Lux Style Awards
Lux Style Awards
Lux
Lux
Lux